Ayadaw may refer to several places in Burma:

Ayadaw -a town in Sagaing Region, Burma and seat of Ayadaw Township
Ayadaw, Mingin